The National Taiwan Science Education Center (NTSEC) is an educational center in Shilin District, Taipei, Taiwan. The mission of the center is to promote the teaching of applied science throughout Taiwan.

History
NTSEC was established in 1956 in Zhongzheng District, Taipei. In 2003, it moved to Shilin District to its current place today. The center is temporarily closed since 15 May 2021 due to the ongoing COVID-19 pandemic.

Architecture
The NTSEC building is a 11-story building consists of theaters, laboratories, lobby, restaurant, life science exhibition area, materials science exhibition area, mathematics and earth science exhibition area, temporary exhibitions galleries, library and administration area.

Exhibitions
The center displays permanent exhibitions on life science, physics, chemistry, mathematics, and earth sciences. On an attraction called the Sky Bike, visitors can cycle the length of the building on a wire 20 meters in the air.

Transportation
The museum is accessible within walking distance northwest from Shilin Station of the Taipei Metro.

See also
 List of tourist attractions in Taiwan

References

External links

 

1956 establishments in Taiwan
Buildings and structures completed in 2003
Buildings and structures in Taipei
Museums established in 1956
Relocated buildings and structures in Taiwan
Science centers in Taiwan